Łukasz Tumicz (born March 1, 1985 in Lidzbark Warmiński) is a Polish football forward.

Successes

 1x Polish Cup Winner (2009/10) with Jagiellonia Białystok.

Career

Club
Prior to becoming a professional, Tumicz played college soccer at the University of Rhode Island, wearing #31.  He also played for the Rhode Island Stingrays during the summers. He was selected 34th overall in the 2008 MLS Supplemental Draft by Columbus Crew, but he did not sign a developmental contract.

He scored his first goal in the Polish premier league on April 12, 2008 against Wisła Kraków.

In March 2009, following extended health problems, Jagiellonia loaned him out to Supraślanka Supraśl in order to regain fitness.

In January 2011, he joined Górnik Polkowice on a one and a half year contract.

In July 2011, he signed a contract with Olimpia Grudziądz.

References

External links
 

1985 births
Living people
Polish footballers
Polish expatriate footballers
OKS Stomil Olsztyn players
Rhode Island Rams men's soccer players
Rhode Island Stingrays players
Jagiellonia Białystok players
Górnik Polkowice players
Olimpia Grudziądz players
Ruch Radzionków players
Zagłębie Sosnowiec players
USL League Two players
People from Lidzbark Warmiński
Expatriate soccer players in the United States
Columbus Crew draft picks
Sportspeople from Warmian-Masurian Voivodeship
Association football forwards
Polish expatriate sportspeople in the United States